"Old Heart Falls" is a song by Swedish band Katatonia. It is the first single off of their tenth studio album The Fall of Hearts.

Background
"Old Heart Falls" was released as the first single from Katatonia's tenth studio album, The Fall of Hearts. It was released on March 30, 2016, almost two months prior to the release of its respective album. A music video was released for the track on the same date. The video was centered around a man typing out the song's lyrics on an old typewriter. Guitarist Anders Nystrom described the idea behind the video:

The music video was created by Lasse Hoile, frequent video collaborator with Steven Wilson of Porcupine Tree.

Composition and themes
Billboard reported that Renkse described the song as "lush textures, distinct dynamics, and memorable chorus", but that it wasn't meant to represent the sound of the entire album, which was not released at the time of the song's release. AllMusic described the song's composition as containing "modal melody and syncopated dynamic structure, offers fat crescendoes and dropouts as swirling Mellotron strings, keyboard-simulated vibraphones, and a layers of reverb is cinematic in scope." Lyrically, the song was noted for its said lyrics, with outlets like MetalSucks noting the lyrics appeared to be "full of lamenting one’s heartache and wondering why the world allows such agony to exist." Encountering sorrow, and leaving behind one's dreams, are repeatedly alluded to over the course of the song.

Reception
The song was generally well-received by critics. In their dedicated song review, MetalSucks praised the song, but conceded that its lyrical content was "his song is super, super sad...sadder than Edgar Allan Poe", and that the music video accentuated the song's themes even further. Similarly, Metal Injection, alluded to the song's gloominess, but concluded that "At no point should you even question if this song is going to be on repeat for the rest of the day, and if it's going to be stuck in your head for the next week. You know it will be, and you know it is." Yell Magazine described the song as "tragically beautiful".

Personnel
Band
Jonas Renkse – lead vocals, keyboards
Anders Nyström – guitars, keyboards, backing vocals
Roger Öjersson – guitars
Niklas Sandin – bass
Daniel Moilanen – drums

Production
Jonas Renkse – production
Anders Nystrom – production
Jens Bogren – mixing, mastering

References

2016 singles